Weird Love is the sixth full-length album by Australian rock band The Scientists, released in 1986 by record label Karbon. It consists of new recordings  from their earlier singles and EPs during 3 days in London with Richard Mazda for the US market.

Reception 

AllMusic called it "a bash fest from the start that is relentlessly powerful and intense". Trouser Press called it "poundingly intense".

References

External links 
 

1986 albums
The Scientists albums